is a retired Japanese professional tennis player.

Career
Naoko Sato best results came in the doubles. She reached final of 1978 Australian Open with Pam Whytcross which they lost to Betsy Nagelsen and Renáta Tomanová in straight sets.

Grand Slam finals

Doubles: 1 (0–1)

References

External links
 
 
 

Japanese female tennis players
Living people
1955 births
Sportspeople from Tokyo
20th-century Japanese women